The UCCP Cosmopolitan Church is a Protestant church in Manila, Philippines.

History
The Cosmopolitan Church's establishment traces back to the 1930s when 60 members of the Central Methodist Church at Kalaw Street, Ermita, Manila seceded from the American Methodist Episcopal Church in March 1933. The secession was led by  Rev. Cipriano Navarro, Dr. Melquiades Gamboa, and Rev. Samuel Stagg who were instrumental to the creation of the Philippine Methodist Episcopal Church which in turn led to the establishment of the Cosmopolitan Student Church.

The Cosmopolitan Church building was established in 1936. From 1942-1944 the Church building was used as a base of operations by Church members who were also part of the anti-Japanese guerilla resistance forces during the World War II. The Church building was eventually seized by the Japanese in September 1944. The Church building was rebuilt in 1945 after the building was burnt during the Battle of Manila. In 1948 Cosmopolitan Church, of the then Philippine Methodist Church, became part of the United Church of Christ in the Philippines. In 2012, some members of the Cosmopolitan Church led by then Pastor Phoebe Dacanay disaffiliated from the UCCP.

Building
The church currently occupies a four-story building called the Rigos Hall. The Rigos Hall was named after by former pastor, Dr. Cirilio A. Rigos on May 15, 1996. Rigos along with Jovito Salonga organized the Paglingap Ministry to Political Detainees in 1975 which interceded for the release of political prisoners and offered financial aid to their families during the administration of then President Ferdinand Marcos under Martial Law. More than 90 detainees were freed through the effort of Rigos and Salonga's organization after five years. The naming was an effect of the ratification of a Special Church Council Resolution.

The Mary Boyd Stagg Memorial Sanctuary inside the Rigos Hall is a worship place where worship services by the Church is conducted. In 1999 in the event of the 66th anniversary of the Cosmopolitan Church, eight panels of stained glass were installed at the memorial sanctuary.

A chapel inaugurated on January 6, 1978, the Angela Valdez Ramos Memorial Chapel is located within church grounds dedicated to Angela Ramos, for her role in the church's Sunday School. A courtyard, the Founder's Garden is also located within church grounds in between the chapel and Memorial Sanctuary.

Gallery

References

External links
UCCP Cosmopolitan Church Official Website

Churches in Manila
Buildings and structures in Ermita
Cultural Properties of the Philippines in Metro Manila